Lake Hindmarsh, an ephemeral lake located in the Wimmera region of western Victoria, Australia, is the state's largest natural freshwater lake. The nearest towns are Jeparit to the south and Rainbow to the north. After more than a decade of drought, in early 2011 the lake filled as a result of flooding in the region. The Wemba Wemba name of the lake is recorded as Gour or Koor.

Geography
Lake Hindmarsh is the northernmost lake of the Wimmera River Terminal Wetlands, and receives water directly from the Wimmera River. It is a wetland of national significance. On the rare occasions when Lake Hindmarsh overflows, water runs, via Outlet Creek (Wergaia: Krumelak), to the deeper Lake Albacutya (Wergaia: Ngelbakutya), which has been recognised under the Ramsar Convention as a wetland of international importance.
 
Flat and shallow, Lake Hindmarsh is subject to very high evaporation. With flows down the Wimmera River averaging only half of that, the lake rarely fills, but if it does, the water takes three to four years to evaporate entirely.

The lake was full during the wet years of the early to mid-1970s. It supported a commercial fishing industry and was a destination for tourism and water sports, with a water-skiing club having a membership of over 100. The lake filled again in 1996, but then received no further water from the Wimmera River, and had dried up by 2000. It remained dry for almost a decade.

In October 2009, water from the Wimmera River trickled into Lake Hindmarsh for the first time in thirteen years. The 2010 Victorian floods of September raised lake water levels higher and triggered a revival of birdlife. The January 2011 Victorian floods in the Wimmera catchment raised hopes that the lake would fill, and possibly overflow into the lakes to the north. However, Outlet Creek remained dry.

Indigenous people 
The area around the lake is the traditional country of the Gromiluk, a branch of the Wotjobaluk people. They speak the Wergaia language.

Colonial history
Explorer Edward Eyre camped at Lake Hindmarsh in 1838 while searching for an overland route from Melbourne to Adelaide, and named the lake after the then governor of South Australia, John Hindmarsh. European pastoralists occupied land around the lake from 1845, and the Moravian Ebenezer Mission was established nearby in 1859.

See also

Lakes and other water bodies of Victoria

References

Lakes of Victoria (Australia)
Wimmera catchment
Rivers of Grampians (region)
Wimmera